Haplogroup Q-L275 or Haplogroup Q2 (formerly Haplogroup Q1b) is a human Y-chromosome DNA haplogroup believed to have originated in Eurasia.  Haplogroup Q-L275 is defined by the presence of the L275 single-nucleotide polymorphism (SNP).  Haplogroup Q-L275 can be identified through genealogical DNA testing.

Distribution 
Q-L275 has descendants across Europe, Central Asia, and South Asia.

The Americas
Q-L275 has not been identified in pre-Columbian groups in the Americas.  Potential sources in indigenous populations are European colonists and religious missionaries.

Asia

East Asia

South Asia 

The problematic phylogeny sampling of early studies has been demonstrated by subsequent studies that have found the Q-M378 descendant branch in South Asia.

West Asia 

According to Behar et al. 5% of Ashkenazi males belong to haplogroup Q. This has subsequently been found to be entirely Q-L275's Q-M378 subclade and is further restricted to the Q-L245 branch.

Europe

Subclade Distribution
Q-L245 This branch was discovered by citizen scientists. It is a descendant branch of the Q-M378 lineage and is the most common branch in West Asian groups such as Iranians and Jewish populations.

Q-L272.1 This branch was discovered by citizen scientists. It has only been identified in one Sicilian sample.

Q-L301 This branch was discovered by citizen scientists. They have identified it in two unrelated Iranian samples.

Q-L315 This branch was discovered by citizen scientists. It has only been identified in one Ashkenazi Jewish sample. Thus, it is presumed to have arisen after the Q-L245 branch to which it belongs became part of the pre-Diaspora Jewish population.

Q-L327 This branch was discovered by citizen scientists. It has only been identified in one Azorean sample.

Q-L619.2 This branch was discovered by citizen scientists. They have identified it in two unrelated Armenian samples.

Q-P306 This branch was discovered by the University of Arizona research group headed by Dr. Michael Hammer in a Southeast Asian sample. It has been identified by citizen scientists in South Asians.

Q-M378 — It is widely distributed in Europe, South Asia, and West Asia. It is found among samples of Hazaras and Sindhis. It has been found in one individual in a small sample of eleven Lachungpa in Sikkim. It is also found in the Uyghurs of North-Western China in two separate groups. Some Western Jews belong to Q-M378 as well. Q-M378's subbranch Q-L245's subclades Q-Y2200 and Q-YP1035 are the only varieties of haplogroup Q that are found in Ashkenazi Jews. Citizen scientists found that some Sephardic Jews carry different subclades of Q-L245, including Q-BZ3900, Q-YP745, and Q-YP1237.

Associated SNPs 
Q-L275 is currently defined by the SNPs L275, L314, L606, and L612.

Subgroups 
This is Thomas Krahn at the Genomic Research Center's Draft tree Proposed Tree for haplogroup Q-L275.

 L275, L314, L606, L612
 M378, L214, L215
 L245
 L272.1
 L315
 L619.2
 L301
 P306
 L327

See also
Human Y-chromosome DNA haplogroup
Marsh Arabs(on the Y-DNA Q1b-M378 in Marsh Arabs related to Sumer)

Y-DNA Q-M242 Subclades

Y-DNA Backbone Tree

References

External links 
The Y-DNA Haplogroup Q Project

Q-L275